Flyr AS (OSE: FLYR) was a Norwegian low-cost airline. Headquartered in Oslo with an operational base at Oslo Airport, Gardermoen, the airline operated flights within Norway and between Norway and European leisure destinations. Flyr ceased operations on January 31, 2023.

History

Foundation
Flyr was founded by Erik G. Braathen in 2020, the former CEO of the now-defunct Norwegian flag carrier Braathens. The name Flyr is Norwegian for flying. In June 2021, Flyr was issued an Air Operator Certificate by the Norwegian CAA. The airline originally planned to operate up to 30 aircraft to domestic and European destinations, while selling tickets to passengers soley via their own mobile app. The first flight from Oslo to Tromsø was operated by a Boeing 737-800.

As of late 2021, the airline operated up to 25 flights a day and received its overall fourth aircraft. Flyr posted losses of €16 Million during the third quarter of the same year after demand fell behind expectations in the wake of the Coronavirus pandemic.

Financial difficulties
In October 2022, Flyr announced they would cut their winter schedule by half to save nearly 40 Million Euros due to significantly decreased demand. As of November 2022, the airline was in the process to acquire additional funds from investors stating that it otherwise cannot guarantee to maintain its future operations, it however failed to reach the requested sum during the first try. Flyr also stated it would lease at least one of their aircraft to another airline.

On 30 January 2023, Flyr announced that their alternative financial plan failed. The board of directors were looking for a new alternative way to finance the airline. However, on 1 February 2023 the airline went into administration and ceased all flights.

Destinations 
As of June 2021, prior to the closure of operations, Flyr operated flights to the following destinations:

Fleet

, Flyr operated the following aircraft:

References

External links

 

Defunct airlines of Norway
Airlines established in 2020
Airlines disestablished in 2023
Companies listed on the Oslo Stock Exchange
2020 establishments in Norway
2023 disestablishments in Norway